Owlad may refer to:

 Posht Tang-e Parian
 Owlad-e Darbandkabud